Orson Charles (born January 27, 1991) is a former American football tight end and fullback. He played college football at Georgia.

High school career
Charles attended Riverview High School before transferring to Henry B. Plant High School in Tampa, Florida for his senior year, where he was a teammate of Aaron Murray. During a recruiting visit to the University of Florida in 2008, Charles accidentally dropped the school's 2006 National Championship Trophy, breaking the Waterford Crystal football. He played in the 2009 U.S. Army All-American Bowl.

College career
Charles was named a finalist for the 2011 John Mackey Award on November 21, 2011.

Professional career

Cincinnati Bengals
Charles was drafted by the Cincinnati Bengals in the fourth round, 116th overall, of the 2012 NFL Draft. In his rookie season, he played all 16 games, starting 6 of them, accumulating 8 receptions for 101 yards. In 2013 Charles played primarily at fullback; He played 13 games but started none and recorded one catch for eight yards.

New Orleans Saints
On September 23, 2014, Charles was signed to the New Orleans Saints practice squad.

Detroit Lions
On June 16, 2016, Charles was signed by the Detroit Lions. He was released on October 4, 2016.

Kansas City Chiefs
On May 31, 2017, Charles signed with the Kansas City Chiefs. He was waived on September 2, 2017 and was signed to the Chiefs' practice squad the next day. He was released on October 7, 2017. He was re-signed to the practice squad on October 25, 2017. He was promoted to the active roster on November 28, 2017. He was waived by the Chiefs on May 3, 2018.

Cleveland Browns
On July 30, 2018, Charles signed with the Cleveland Browns. He made the Browns final roster as the team's fourth tight end. Despite being listed as a tight end, Charles had lined up primarily as a fullback throughout the 2018 season. He appeared on the 2018 Pro Bowl ballot as a fullback, and Browns coaches have signaled they view him as such. The Browns placed Charles on injured reserve with an ankle injury on December 13, 2018.

On April 3, 2019, Charles re-signed with the Browns. The Browns waived Charles on August 11, 2019.

Denver Broncos
On August 21, 2019, Charles signed with the Denver Broncos. He was released on August 31, 2019. He was re-signed on November 19, 2019, but was released three days later.

Charles was drafted in the 6th round of the 2020 XFL Draft by the DC Defenders, but did not sign with the team.

Legal troubles
Shortly before the 2012 NFL Draft, Charles was arrested for a DUI.

On March 31, 2014, Charles was arrested for wanton endangerment in Richmond, Kentucky. Charles was pulled over by a police officer after another driver called in a complaint that Charles had shown a gun multiple times. In February 2015 Charles pleaded guilty to wanton endangerment and will enter a diversion program.

On July 16, 2022, Charles was arrested for pulling a gun on off-duty police officers in Tampa, Florida.

References

External links
Georgia Bulldogs bio

1991 births
Living people
Players of American football from Tampa, Florida
American football tight ends
Georgia Bulldogs football players
Cincinnati Bengals players
New Orleans Saints players
Detroit Lions players
Kansas City Chiefs players
Cleveland Browns players
Denver Broncos players
Henry B. Plant High School alumni